The 9th Southeast Asia Basketball Association Championship was the qualifying tournament for the 2011 FIBA Asia Championship; it also served as a regional championship involving Southeast Asian basketball teams. It was held on June 23 to June 26, 2011 at Jakarta, Indonesia. The top three finishers qualified to the 2011 FIBA Asia Championship.

Preliminary round

Final

Final standings

Awards

References 

2011
International basketball competitions hosted by Indonesia
2010–11 in Asian basketball
2010–11 in Philippine basketball
2010–11 in Malaysian basketball
2010–11 in Indonesian basketball
2010–11 in Singaporean basketball